The 1906–1907 season was Chelsea Football Club's second competitive season and second year in existence. The club finished as runners-up in the Second Division to secure promotion to the top-flight.

Table

Notes

References

External links
 Chelsea 1906–07 season at stamford-bridge.com

1906-07
English football clubs 1906–07 season